Bhanudasa (1448–1513) (also spelled as Bhanudas), was a Hindu sant who brought back the sacred image of the god Vithoba back from Vijayanagara to Pandharpur, its original location. He was Eknath’s great grandfather. As a boy he worshipped the Sun but later came to worship Vithoba. He is the subject of two chapters in the Bhaktavijaya. His Samadhi situated in solkhambi mandap (exact right side near entrance) of Vitthal temple at Pandharpur.

References

External links
  http://santeknath.org/purveitihas.html

Indian Hindu saints
1448 births
1513 deaths
Warkari
Medieval Hindu religious leaders